Georg Muffat (1 June 1653 – 23 February 1704) was a Baroque composer and organist. He is best known for the remarkably articulate and informative performance directions printed along with his collections of string pieces Florilegium Primum and Florilegium Secundum (First and Second Bouquets) in 1695 and 1698.

Life
Georg Muffat was born in Megève, Duchy of Savoy (now in France), of André Muffat (of Scottish descent) and Marguerite Orsyand. He studied in Paris between 1663 and 1669, where his teacher is often assumed to have been Jean Baptiste Lully. This assumption is largely based on the statement "For six years ... I avidly pursued this style which was flowering in Paris at the time under the most famous Jean Baptiste Lully."  This is ambiguous (in all of the languages in which it was printed) as to whether the style was flourishing under Lully, or that Muffat studied under Lully. In any case, the style which the young Muffat learned was unequivocally Lullian and it remains likely, though unevidenced, that he had at least some contact with the man himself.

After leaving Paris, he became an organist in Molsheim and Sélestat. Later, he studied law in Ingolstadt, afterwards settling in Vienna. He could not get an official appointment, so he travelled to Prague in 1677, then to Salzburg, where he worked for the archbishop for some ten years. In about 1680, he traveled to Italy, there studying the organ with Bernardo Pasquini, a follower of the tradition of Girolamo Frescobaldi; he also met Arcangelo Corelli, whose works he admired very much. From 1690 to his death, he was Kapellmeister to the bishop of Passau.

Georg Muffat should not be confused with his son Gottlieb Muffat, also a successful composer.

Works
His works are strongly influenced by both French and Italian composers:
Sonatas for various instruments (armonico tributo 1682);
Orchestral suites (florilegium primum & secundum 1695);
12 Concerti grossi (auserlesene... instrumental Musik 1701) re-using some thematic material from armonico tributo
12 Toccatas for the organ as well as other pieces : passacaglia, chaconne, air with variations (Apparatus musico-organisticus 1690);
some partitas for the harpsichord, kept as a manuscript
several religious works (notably three masses, Salve Regina, etc.) from which only Missa in labore requies for twenty-four parts is preserved;
3 operas, all now lost ("Marina Armena"; "Königin Marianne die verleumdete Unschuld"; "La fatali felicità di Plutone").

Muffat was, as Johann Jakob Froberger before him, and Handel after him, a cosmopolitan composer who played an important role in the exchanges between European musical traditions. The information contained within the Florilegium Primum and Secundum is nearly unique. These performance directions were intended to assist German string players with the idiom of the French dance style, and include detailed rules for the tempo and order of bow strokes in various types of movement, as well as more general strategies for good ensemble playing and musicianship. These texts remain extremely valuable for modern historically-interested musicians.

Media

Recordings
Armonico Tributo by Les Muffatti (Ramée RAM0502)
"Armonico Tributo & Florilegium Primum" by Ars Antiqua Austria & Gunar Letzbor
12 Concerti Grossi 1701 Musica Aeterna Bratislava (Naxos Records 8.555096, 8.555743)
"12 Concerti Grossi 1701" by Capella Savaria & Pál Németh
 Toccate - Concerti da Chiesa, Martin Gester, Le Parlement de Musique, (Radio France - France Musique: Tempéraments TEM 316013)
"Concertos I-VII" by Holland Baroque Society & Matthew Halls
"Florilegium Secundum, Fasciculus I-IV" by The Academy of Ancient Music & Christopher Hogwood
 Apparatus musico-organisticus (Complete) by Adriano Falcioni, (Brilliant Classics 94493)
 Apparatus musico-organisticus. Douze toccatas pour orgue by René Saorgin, (Harmonia Mundi HMU966-967)

References

External links

1653 births
1704 deaths
People from Haute-Savoie
German Baroque composers
German classical composers
German classical organists
Organists and composers in the South German tradition
German male organists
Pupils of Bernardo Pasquini
18th-century keyboardists
German male classical composers
Male classical organists